Gerania is a village and a community of the Elassona municipality. Before the 2011 local government reform it was a part of the municipality of Sarantaporo, of which it was a municipal district. The 2011 census recorded 411 inhabitants in the village. The community of Gerania covers an area of 16.038 km2.

Economy
The population of Gerania is occupied in animal husbandry and agriculture.

History
The village was named Delinista until 1927. In 1943 it was burned by the Axis occupation forces.

Population
According to the 2011 census, the population of the settlement of Gerania was 251 people, a decrease of almost 30% compared with the population of the previous census of 2001.

See also
 List of settlements in the Larissa regional unit

References

Populated places in Larissa (regional unit)